Aaron Fukuhara (born November 11, 1991) is a judoka from the United States.

He is a member of Gardena Judo Club. He won a silver medal at the Pan American Judo Championships in the non-Olympic super lightweight category to 55 kg.

Achievements

References 

 

American male judoka
1991 births
Living people